Charlie Fulton was a former American football quarterback who played two seasons with the Edmonton Eskimos of the Canadian Football League and professional wrestler. He was drafted by the Boston Patriots in the sixteenth round of the 1968 NFL Draft. He played college football at the University of Tennessee. As a wrestler he worked in Tennessee, Mid-Atlantic, and the World Wrestling Federation from 1981 to 1985.

References

External links
Just Sports Stats
College stats
Fanbase profile

1949 births
2016 deaths
Players of American football from Memphis, Tennessee
American football quarterbacks
Canadian football quarterbacks
American players of Canadian football
Tennessee Volunteers football players
Edmonton Elks players
Players of Canadian football from Memphis, Tennessee
American male professional wrestlers